Alexander Vasilyevich Barchenko (1881, Yelets — April, 1938) was a Russian biologist and researcher of anomalous phenomena from St. Petersburg. In 1904 Barchenko attended the biological faculty of Kazan University, and subsequently entered Yuryev University (today Tartu University). He is known first and foremost for his researchings of Hyperborea in Russian Far East region.

In 1925, he met and corresponded with Rabbi Menachem Mendel Schneerson, who assisted him in his research and studies of religious and mystical matters.

He was executed in Moscow during the Great Purge on April 25, 1938.

See also
 Gleb Bokii

References

1881 births
1938 deaths
People from Yelets
Russian biologists
20th-century biologists